The Cage is the name of two different breakfast shows on Australian radio network Triple M, broadcasting in Brisbane and Melbourne. Previously Sydney and Adelaide received the Melbourne version, however these cities now have their own individual shows.
The Melbourne Cage finished up at the end of 2007. They broadcast the last show after 6 years in November. It was announced that the team and Triple M have decided not to continue after longtime member James Brayshaw decided not to return. From 2008, comedian Peter Helliar took over the Melbourne breakfast spot with co-host Myf Warhurst. On 7 September 2009, The Hot Breakfast with Eddie McGuire took over the Melbourne breakfast slot.

The Cage (Brisbane)

The breakfast show on Triple M Brisbane is The Cage. Breakfast begins from 5:30am weekdays with The Cage with Ian Skippen, Marto, Sully and Emily Jade O'Keefe on 104.5 Triple M. In September 2011, after six years the show finished due to lackluster ratings.

The Cage (Melbourne) 

The Melbourne version of The Cage was made up of Peter Berner, Brigitte Duclos, James Brayshaw, Matt Parkinson & Mike Fitzpatrick, however they were often referred to by their nicknames: "Pete", "Brig", "JB", "Parko" & "Fitzy" respectively. The show ran from 6:00 am to 9:00 am weekdays (AEDST) and contained regular segments such as Jason Donovans Autobiography, Parko's Idiot Box, JB's Spin On Sport, The Duclos Report, JB's Internet Joke, Happy News, The Great Cage Debate and the Scared Weird Little Guys doing Song of the Week.

As well as celebrity interviews, snap phone polls, music and comical chatter. It featured characters created by Matt Parkinson including Nurry from Frankston, Ivan Inkling of Special Squad, Dr. G.I. Low, Keith McKorkin, Nicky Knuckles, Hugh Jorgen, Gene Creamer, Gavin Spotsworth, Randy Buff, Antonio Banderas, Captain Speaking, Mike Tyson and David "Becks" Beckham. Duclos also contributed her own character in one episode, to gender-balance the characters on the show. Her character was known as Pretty McClitty and Duclos basically talked in a drawn-out bogan style voice.

Regular celebrity guests included Jason Dunstall, Laura Csortan, Peter Rowsthorn and Garry Lyon. Previous regular Cage members were Tim Smith ("Timbo"), Matthew Quartermaine ("Quarters"), Russell Gilbert ("Gilbo") and Trevor Marmalade ("Trev").

History 
The show began in Melbourne at the start of 2002, when Tim Smith was given free rein to put together a new drive time show. When the breakfast show at the time flopped, The Cage was moved to the vacant breakfast slot only three months after it began. A relay of the breakfast show, with about 20% new content, was played in the drive slot. Triple M eventually decided in July 2002 to concentrate The Cage on breakfast only. In October 2006, Sydney radio ratings had 2Day FM winning the FM market and Triple M, with The Cage breakfast team slipping to 6.8 per cent, down 1.2 points and reigniting speculation over whether the show would continue the following year. At the end of 2006, it was reported that the drive-time program The Shebang would replace The Cage in the breakfast shift in Sydney, due to declining ratings, put down the shows inability to be able to talk about local issues due to the Sydney/Melbourne duality of the show. Austereo announced on the 14th of December 2006 that The Shebang would move to the morning shift for Triple M Sydney in 2007. From January 29, 2007, The Cage has only the morning shift in Melbourne. The cast remained unchanged from 2006. As of November 2007, the Melbourne Cage finished up and from 2008, comedian Peter Helliar and former Triple J/ABC personality Myf Warhurst took over the Melbourne breakfast spot.

Events 
During the period of 16–20 October 2006, The Cage ran a competition where listeners had to travel across Australia to Escape the Cage. Teams of people had to get as far away from either Sydney or Melbourne within 5 days and whoever went the furthest distance would win $5000 cash.

In February 2007, The Cage held a night of stand-up comedy, The Cage on Stage, to raise money for those affected by the Victorian bushfires. Comedians on the night included all the Cagers as well as Wil Anderson, Greg Fleet and Cal Wilson.

In March 2007, The Cage held an exhibition of Brig's "meditation art", consisting of a painting of an orange elephant, an orange lady, a brown bear and a blank canvas for the week Brig missed class. $1850 was raised at auction and donated to the Camp Quality charity. Former comedian and former National Gallery of Victoria President Steve Vizard was one of the bidders.

To coincide with the 12th FINA world championships in Melbourne, The Cage held a Suburban Swim Challenge on the 23rd of March 2007 at the Waves Leisure Centre in Highett, Victoria.

References

External links
Official website for the Melbourne Cage
Official website for the Brisbane Cage

Australian radio programs
2002 radio programme debuts
2007 radio programme endings